The 1951 National League Division One was the 17th season of speedway in the United Kingdom and the sixth post-war season of the highest tier of motorcycle speedway in Great Britain.

Summary
The entrants were the same as the previous season as were the top three positions at the end of the season. Wembley Lions won the National League for the sixth time.

Final table

Top Ten Riders (League only)

National Trophy Stage Three
The 1951 National Trophy was the 14th edition of the Knockout Cup. The Trophy consisted of three stages; stage one was for the third division clubs, stage two was for the second division clubs and stage three was for the top tier clubs. The winner of stage one would qualify for stage two and the winner of stage two would qualify for the third and final stage. Wimbledon won the third and final stage and were therefore declared the 1951 National Trophy champions.

 For Stage One - see Stage One
 For Stage Two - see Stage Two

First round

Second round

Semifinals

Final

First leg

Second leg

Wimbledon were National Trophy Champions, winning on aggregate 125–91.

See also
 List of United Kingdom Speedway League Champions
 Knockout Cup (speedway)

References

Speedway National League
Speedway National League
1951 in British motorsport